Miko Mälberg (born 3 May 1985 in Tallinn) is an Estonian freestyle swimmer. He competed for his native country at the 2008 Summer Olympics in Beijing, China, where he finished in 25th place in the men's 50 metre freestyle clocking 22.37 seconds in the preliminary.

See also
 List of Estonian records in swimming

References

External links
 Miko Mälberg Bio on LSUsports.net

1985 births
Living people
Swimmers from Tallinn
Estonian male freestyle swimmers
Swimmers at the 2008 Summer Olympics
Olympic swimmers of Estonia
21st-century Estonian people